St Aloysius' College is a Roman Catholic, boys-only state school in the London Borough of Islington, England. Each year around 180 pupils are admitted to Year 7 (aged 11 or 12) on the basis of examination; the local education authority also assigns students without another school to this school. It is the oldest surviving foundation of its kind in the Archdiocese of Westminster.

History
St Aloysius' College was founded in 1879 by the Brothers of Mercy as a Roman Catholic private boarding and day school and then a grammar school. The control of the college was passed to the De La Salle Brothers in 1960. It turned comprehensive in 1971 with the reorganisation of the English education system, and merged with local boys' comprehensive St. William of York in the 1980s.

The school went through a turbulent period during the 1990s with declining academic standards and the subsequent loss of its sixth form. It reopened the sixth form in September 2010 and admitted a small number of girls. It was awarded the Sportsmark and Artsmark awards. It also featured in a Dispatches special on Channel 4 TV documentary Undercover Teacher.

The school is used by the National Youth Theatre for many of its auditions and courses.

Academics
Pupils usually take 10 or 11 GCSE subjects.

The sixth form is part of a collaboration of local schools in the area known as the Islington Sixth Form Consortium. Fourteen AS Level and four A2 subjects and a number of BTEC courses were available in 2012.

Ofsted inspection
The school underwent Ofsted inspection in November 2018, receiving a Grade 3 ("Requires Improvement").  Effectiveness of leadership and management and Personal development, behaviour and welfare were graded as good.In 2022 they recived a Good.

Pupil protest
In 2019 year 10 to 13 pupils protested outside the school, leading to the school agreeing to review sixth formers' dress code, and an end to compulsory study time. Some parents supported their children,  commenting on "petty behaviour rules" and the school not adhering to its policies.

Notable former pupils

Moses Barnett, footballer
Gary Breen, footballer
Joe Cole, footballer
Bobson Bawling, footballer playing for Crawley Town
Dappy, rapper and singer 
Jabo Ibehre, footballer playing for Oldham Athletic on loan from Colchester United
Tyrone Edgar, sprinter
Michael Gambon, actor
John Harvey, writer
James Herbert, writer
Daniel Kaluuya, actor
Peter Sellers, actor
Ronald Shiner, actor
Nonso Anozie, actor
Armstrong Okoflex, footballer playing for Celtic

References

External links

Redevelopment Plan for St Aloysius' College, part of Islington's "Schools for the Future" initiative
St Aloysius RC College Islington from the BBC English School Tables 2006

Educational institutions established in 1879
Boys' schools in London
Catholic secondary schools in the Archdiocese of Westminster
Secondary schools in the London Borough of Islington
1879 establishments in England
Voluntary aided schools in London